The Cincinnati Pippins, also known as the Cincinnati Cams, were a franchise in the United States Baseball League based in Cincinnati, Ohio and was owned by New York attorney John J. Ryan. The team and the league lasted just over a month, from May 1 to June 5, 1912. The highest number of games played by any of the eight team league was 26. The USBL originally planned to have a 126-game season.

The home field was Hippodrome Park, which was located at Spring Garden Avenue and Queen City Avenue. The ballpark had been built in 1911, and had fallen out of use by the 1930s. The two roads no longer intersect.

1912 Standings 
In the one and only year for the United States Baseball League, the Pippins held a 12-10 record at 4th place in the league.

Notable players
 Bugs Raymond
 Ben Taylor

References 

 
Defunct baseball teams in Ohio
United States Baseball League teams
1912 establishments in Ohio
1912 disestablishments in Ohio
Baseball teams disestablished in 1912
Baseball teams established in 1912